Sonora Peak is a mountain in the Central Sierra Nevada of California north of Sonora Pass. Located on the boundary between Alpine and Mono counties, it is the highest point in Alpine County. Due to the high elevation, most of the precipitation this mountain receives consists of snow.

Hiking
Starting at the trailhead of the PCT on Sonora Pass, it is about a  hike with  elevation gain to the top of a pass. From there, the easiest and most direct way is to turn northwest and follow the ridge that will lead to the summit. About halfway from the pass to the peak a small trail appears that heads directly to the peak. A second approach to the summit is from nearby Saint Mary's Pass trailhead. This trail approaches the peak from the other side of the mountain (the northwestern side) and is also a class 1 hike.

References

External links 
 

Mountains of the Sierra Nevada (United States)
Mountains of Alpine County, California
Mountains of Mono County, California
Mountains of Northern California